Renata Fernandes dos Santos Diniz (born 1 November 1985) is a Brazilian women's international footballer who plays as a defender for Flamengo. She has been a member of the Brazil women's national football team. She was a non-playing squad member at the 2003 FIFA Women's World Cup. She was also included in the national teams for the 2003 and 2011 editions of the Pan American Games.

Club career
In 2005 Diniz moved to the United States and played 12 games for Hampton Roads Piranhas of the pro–am W-League.

International career

Youth
Diniz played for the Brazil women's national under-20 football team at the 2002 and 2004 editions of the FIFA U-20 Women's World Cup.

Senior
As a 17-year-old Santos player Diniz was part of the gold medal-winning Brazil team at the 2003 Pan American Games. At the 2003 FIFA Women's World Cup, she was named in a revamped Brazil squad and praised by coach Paulo Gonçalves: "Renata Diniz is a young player but she is very good and will help us a lot." She returned to the national team for the 2011 Pan American Games.

References

External links
 
 Agent profile 

1985 births
Living people
Brazilian women's footballers
Brazil women's international footballers
2003 FIFA Women's World Cup players
Women's association football defenders
Clube de Regatas do Flamengo (women) players
São José Esporte Clube (women) players
Hampton Roads Piranhas players
Expatriate women's soccer players in the United States
Brazilian expatriate sportspeople in the United States
Pan American Games gold medalists for Brazil
Pan American Games medalists in football
Santos FC (women) players
Brazilian expatriate women's footballers
People from Taboão da Serra